Sephokong is a community council located in the Leribe District of Lesotho. Its population in 2006 was 19,199.

Villages
The community of Sephokong includes the villages of Boribeng, Chafo, Falatsa, Ha 'Mamokoaqo, Ha Au, Ha Au (Nqechane), Ha Bolofo, Ha Isaka, Ha Jakote (Boitelo), Ha Jonathane (Leribe-Moreneng), Ha Josefa (Phatsoe), Ha Kukame (Nqechane), Ha Lapisi (Nqechane), Ha Lehlaha, Ha Lelahla, Ha Letsola-Thebe, Ha Mamokoaqo, Ha Maraisane (Boribeng), Ha Matau (Lithabaneng), Ha Mohapi, Ha Mokhachane, Ha Mokhosi (Papalala), Ha Moshephe, Ha Mosisi, Ha Mosiuoa, Ha Mothetsi, Ha Mothibe, Ha Motseki, Ha Nkhasi (Matsoaing), Ha Phooko, Ha Popa, Ha Pulenyane (Phatsoe), Ha Ralefepo, Ha Ramabanta (Moneseng), Ha Sera, Ha Sera (Ha Mamanyatsa), Ha Setjeo (Pote), Ha Simone, Ha Thinyane, Ha Tlhako, Ha Topia (Nqechane), Ha Topisi, Ha Tota, Ha Tsielala, Levi's Nek, Likoting, Liphakoeng, Litlhokoaneng, Mabuleng, Machoaboleng, Maiseng, Manyakheng, Mohlomong, Mohobollo, Molikaliko (Ha Mothetsi), Mphokong (Ha Jonathane), Phahameng, Phelandaba, Tale, Tlokoeng (Nqechane) and Tsekong.

References

External links
 Google map of community villages

Populated places in Leribe District